Kyle Killen is an American television writer and producer. He is best known as the creator and showrunner of the critically acclaimed but short-lived television series Lone Star (2010), Awake (2012) and Mind Games (2014). He also wrote the screenplay of Jodie Foster's The Beaver (2011).

Early life and education
Killen was born in Chicago and moved with his family to Burleson, Texas when he was three. He is a graduate of the film school at the University of Southern California.

Career
Killen is the creator of the short-lived series Lone Star and Awake. He recently created the drama series Mind Games for ABC. He also wrote the feature film The Beaver, filmed in 2009 and released in 2011. It was directed by Jodie Foster and starred Jodie Foster and Mel Gibson. A second film written by Killen, 2013's Scenic Route, was directed by Kevin and Michael Goetz. His directorial debut is Mind Games'''s season finale As God Is My Witness. In June, 2016, Killen revised Jeremy Slater's draft of Netflix's adaptation of Death Note. On June 28, 2018, Killen was hired as showrunner and executive producer of the Halo series. On June 25, 2021, Killen left the role of showrunner and executive producer of the Halo series.

Personal life
Until starting work on Awake, Killen had been based in Austin, Texas. After graduating from USC and leaving Los Angeles, he wrote short fiction and first-person journalism. While working at what he called "real jobs" (computer support, construction), Killen found it hard to give up screenplay-writing. In a last-ditch effort, he returned to L.A., dressed up as a courier and dropped copies of a script at every agency he could find. Six months later, one of those agents called. "That script probably wasn't deserving of getting produced," he told the trade publication Variety in a 2011 "10 TV Scribes to Watch" feature, "but it got me a teeny, tiny toe in the door." Killen told the Austin American-Statesman'' in 2010 that "I quit, but I never really quit. I took a lot of horrible, crazy jobs, but I always ended up writing about them or writing things that came out of them." Killen is married to an ER doctor; the couple have three children.

References

External links

Q & A with Kyle Killen and Howard Gordon
Kyle Killen at blogspot

American male screenwriters
Television producers from Illinois
American television writers
Living people
Writers from Chicago
People from Burleson, Texas
USC School of Cinematic Arts alumni
Year of birth missing (living people)
Awake (TV series)
American male television writers
Screenwriters from Illinois
Screenwriters from Texas
Television producers from Texas